The  is a series of full-size SUVs manufactured by Nissan in Japan and sold throughout the world. 

The Patrol has been available as either a short-wheelbase (SWB) three-door or a long-wheelbase (LWB) five-door chassis since 1951. The LWB version has been offered in pickup truck and cab chassis variants. Between 1988 and 1994, Ford Australia marketed the Patrol as the Ford Maverick. In some European countries, such as Spain, the Patrol was marketed by Ebro as the Ebro Patrol. In 1980 in Japan, it was rebadged and alternately sold at Nissan Prince Store locations as the Nissan Safari.

The Patrol is available in Australia, Central and South America, South Africa, parts of Southeast Asia, and Western Europe, as well as Iran and the Middle East. For the 2011 model year, it was made available in North America as the upscale Infiniti QX56 (later renamed as Infiniti QX80), the first time that a Patrol-based vehicle had been sold in North America since 1969, and for the 2017 model year, it would be offered in that market as the Nissan Armada.



First generation (4W60; 1951) 

In September 1951, the 4W60 was introduced exclusively to Japanese Nissan dealerships. The overall styling was similar to the Willys Jeep. The 4W60 used the  3.7 L Nissan NAK engine from the Nissan 290 bus, but with part-time four-wheel drive and a four-speed manual transmission. The grille had a pressed-steel Nissan badge. A 4W70 Carrier-based wagon was available.

The 4W61 was introduced in August 1955; it changed the grille (with some chrome bars), a one-piece windshield that sits further back when folded, chrome strips on the hood, and unequally sized seats (passenger's side is wider than the driver's). The other big change was the engine. The 4W61 was powered by the new 3.7 L Nissan NB engine, producing , and later was powered by the  4.0 L Nissan NC engine. The grille badge was chrome and red and said "NISSAN".

In October 1958, the 4W65 Patrol replaced the 4W61. The 4W65 changed the grille, which now had all chrome bars and redesigned front fenders and hood. A "NISSAN" badge was on the grille and "Patrol" badges were added on the sides of the hood. An eight-seater hardtop wagon, the WG4W65, was added. The short-lived 4W66 Patrol was introduced in December 1956, powered by the  4.0 L P engine. The 4W66 was discontinued in June 1960. A wagon version of the 4W66 was called the Carrier, from 1956 to 1959.

4W70 series 
The Nissan 4W70 Carrier was introduced in 1950 based on the Dodge M37. The 4W70 used the M37's chassis, but the 4W60 Patrol's drivetrain. The grille was narrower and the front fenders changed. The 4W72 was introduced in 1955 (the 4W71 designation was skipped) with changes to the hood, grille, and headlights. Power increased to 105 hp due to the new Nissan NC engine. Modifications again to the hood, fenders, and grille and an increase in power to  led to the 4W73, introduced in 1959 and powered by the Nissan P engine.

Second generation (60; 1959–1980) 

The soft-top Nissan Patrol 60 (two-door;  wheelbase) and G60 (two-door;  wheelbase) were first sold in Australia in 1960. Left-hand drive L60/GL60 models were sold outside of Australia.

Canadian and American customers could get Patrols only from 1962 until 1969. Patrols were sold through Datsun dealerships, making it the only Nissan-badged vehicle sold in the USA until the early 1980s, when the Datsun marque was phased out (barring a small test batch of about 100 Nissan Cedrics that was also exported to the US in the early 60s). An extra-long wheelbase version, the H60, was also available.

The 4WD Nissan Patrol 60 series was produced in short, medium, and long wheelbase versions. It had a manual transmission type-F3B83L at first with three and later with four speeds, and a two-speed transfer case with part-time four-wheel drive. The motor was the P engine, a  inline overhead-valve six-cylinder, featuring bathtub-shaped combustion chambers and a fully balanced seven-bearing crank shaft. With two doors in front and one at the back and four seats (driver and companion in front, two parallel back seats), the extra-long wheelbase version (the H60) was available with eight-passenger capacity.

In 1963, the KG60 (and KGL60) hard-top models were introduced.

Nissan Australia claimed that the 60 series Patrol was the first vehicle to drive across the Simpson Desert in Australia, and built much publicity around the 50th anniversary of the event, including a re-enactment with a similar vehicle ending on 21 July 2012 to publicise the impending release of their new-generation Y62. However, a conflicting account claimed that a Toyota Land Cruiser support vehicle arrived before the Patrol.

Jonga 

Beginning around 1969, the Indian Army's Vehicle Factory Jabalpur  began assembling the quarter-ton Nissan Patrol as the Jonga, along with the Nissan 4W73. The name as per Indian army records is an acronym for Jabalpur Ordinance aNd Guncarriage Assembly. Both the Nissan vehicles were fitted with the same engines and shared many parts. The Jonga was briefly sold to civilian customers with a 4.0-litre Hino diesel engine in 1996, but demand was low, due to an uncompetitive price, as well as unappealing looks. Less than 200 units were sold. The Jonga served faithfully until the late 1990s, when it was replaced by the lighter Mahindra and Mahindra MM550. Auctioned ex-Army Jongas, stretched and converted to people carriers, still serve in some rural areas of India.

Third generation (160; 1980) 

The 160 series was introduced in 1980 to replace the 60 series. In Australia, these are sold as the MQ Patrol. In 1980, the available engines were the L28, P40, and SD33. All models were available with a four-speed manual transmission, while a three-speed automatic was optional on long-wheelbase vehicles fitted with the L28 engine. All 160 series Patrols came with a two-speed offset transfer case, which featured a 1:1 high gear and a low gear.

All models had leaf -spring suspension. The SD33 vehicles feature 24-volt electronics. Different trim options and colors were available, with options including vinyl or carpet floors and blue or brown interior trim. Air conditioning and power steering were available on deluxe models.

The front differential in all models was C200. In Australia, the standard rear differential was the H233. Some versions featured limited slip differentials. A heavy-duty model rear differential was used in some pickup trucks and P40-engined wagons. This was the H260 model differential. In European markets, where less onerous off-road use was expected, the light-duty C200 rear differential was installed in some vehicles.

In 1983, the MQ was updated as MK Patrol, but this does not appear on any Nissan literature or service manuals. Nissan parts dealers do not recognise these initials. Updates included a revised front end with rectangular headlights and an upgraded front suspension. The four-speed gearbox was revised and a fifth gear was added for most models. The four-speed was still used in some lower specificationed units, presumably to run out stock. A high roof ("Super Roof") version of the wagon was added at the same time along with the SD33T turbo-diesel option. With , the turbodiesel can reach .

The naturally aspirated SD33 diesel engine was updated at this time. Revisions included the use of three piston rings instead of five, piston oil squirters, and a spin-on oil filter instead of a paper cartridge type. In Australia and some other parts of the world, the SD33-engined Patrols were revised to standard 12-volt electronics. To accommodate the turbodiesel's extra power, these models featured a larger clutch (270 versus 240 mm) and larger oil cooler (five rows versus three) than the naturally aspirated version.

These were the last Patrols to carry the Datsun brand; in line with the rest of the Nissan lineup, the Patrol lost its Datsun branding in 1984 in most markets.

Spanish production 
Nissan acquired a 35.85% stake in Motor Ibérica in 1980, which was increased to 54.68% in 1982. In early 1983, the first Spanish-made Nissan Patrol left the plant in Zona Franca, near Barcelona. The first year's production, planned to be 4,000 to 5000 cars, was earmarked for Spain and Portugal. Exports were to follow during 1984. Nissan Ibérica-built Patrols originally received a Spanish-made Perkins MD27 four-cylinder diesel engine and Spanish transmission to meet local content regulations. Later on, this was replaced by the A428, which evolved into the A428T and then the A428II. Later yet, the RD28 and the RD28T were added to Spanish-made cars.

260 (1986–1993) 

The 260 series was a facelifted version of the Spanish-built 160 (easily spotted by the rectangular headlamps) sold in Europe and available in SWB and LWB with L28, SD33, RD28 and RD28T engines. The SD-engined version, at least in the UK market, had a 24-volt electrical system. Nissan helped Nissan Ibérica amortize plant investments. The 260 Patrol later received a facelift with a new grille similar to that of the Y60 series which succeeded this generation elsewhere. Spanish production continued until 1994 for export and until 2002 for the Spanish domestic market.

Fourth generation (Y60; 1987) 

The Y60 was radically different mechanically from its predecessors, as it was the first Patrol with coil-spring suspension, increasing comfort and improving rough-ground handling. All Y60 Patrols had a three-link live axle suspension set-up at the front, with all wagons (SWB, LWB, and SWB LW) adopting a five-link set-up at the rear. The utility model was available with both a leaf-spring rear axle, and from 1994 onwards, a choice of the same coil-spring rear axle as the wagons. Sway bars were included on both front and rear coil-spring live axles. Power steering was standard. Some wagon models had front and rear disc brakes, while the utility retained rear drum brakes. The introduction of a synchromesh on reverse gear was another improvement.

The alternative model codes of GR and GQ were applied to left- and right-hand drive models, respectively.

Most models had a rear limited slip differential and some variants had a vacuum or electric solenoid-operated manual rear differential lock. A rear sway bar release mechanism appeared on some models. Some Y60s had a power take-off-driven front-mounted winch, with an in-cab control lever to the right of the gearstick.

The Patrol was also branded as Safari in Japan, depending on which Japanese dealership was offering it – Safari at Nissan Prince Shop and Patrol at Nissan Bluebird Shop. The Safari was available with an optional 24V electrical system, instead of the standard 12V. This was the first series that placed the exterior dimensions in the higher tax bracket for the wider exterior measurement as defined in Japanese Government dimension regulations and the larger engines added a higher road tax obligation for Japanese owners.

The TD42 and TB42 were available with either a five-speed manual or a four-speed automatic gearbox. The RD28T and the RB30 offered only a five-speed manual.

Trim levels in Australia included:
 DX with manual mirrors, no central locking, vinyl interior, optional AC, manual locking hubs
 RX (from 1995) with electric mirrors, central locking, carpet interior, AC, manual locking hubs
 ST with electric windows, electric mirrors, central locking, carpet interior, AC, automatic locking hubs
 Ti (from late 1989) was equipped with an electronic fuel-injected engine, electric windows, electric mirrors, central locking, velour and carpet interior, rear AC, seven-speaker sound system, alloy three-spoke wheels, and automatic locking hubs. It had a high roof design with sunroof until 1991. Leather and woodgrain trim was made standard in 1992 with the Series 2.

Several dealer-fitted accessories were available, including sunroofs, roof racks, tow bars, driving lights, cargo barriers, and side steps. The TD42 was available with an optional Safari turbocharger at some Australian dealers.

Trim levels in Europe varied by country. These include designations such as SLX, LX, LW, and many others in France. Finnish Patrols came standard with two batteries. These were produced only for extreme off-road championships. The engine and chassis remained the same.

Two major updates came in Australia, one in 1992 (GQ Series 2), and one in 1995 (minor facelift). The most notable changes in 1992 were the introduction of fuel-injection on the TB42 motor, EGR valve and oil cooler on the RD28T, new seats, new trim, sound deadening, and side intrusion bars. Other 1992 Series 2 refinements included a revised transmission and suspension, and introducing bigger brakes, bigger wheels, and the standardization of limited slip differentials and auto-freewheeling hubs. This update included new seats, trim, and side intrusion bars.

In 1991, the rear indicators, tail lights, and brake lights were relocated to the bumper from the body to meet Australian Design Rules, but they stayed the same in European versions. In 1992, another set of indicators was placed on the front quarter panel.

In August 1993, the TD42 lost weight to reduce fuel consumption and increase maximum engine speed. This had the side effect of weakening the engine. The original engine can be identified by its silver rocker cover, whereas the lightened engine featured a black rocker cover. The RD28T got some extra changes, moving the vacuum pump from behind the alternator to the top of the engine. Driver-side airbags appeared in some European models.

Changes in 1995 featured a minor facelift, with a redesigned front grille and the RX model entering Australia.
Known weaknesses included vibrations from the front end (largely fixed under warranty), cracking hinges on the rear door (due to the spare tyre's weight), and rust on rear window frames. The RD28T and TB42 engines suffered from head gasket issues when driven with a heavy foot. European five-speed gearboxes suffered from bearing failures in fifth gear at high mileages. However, the TD42 was highly reliable. Patrols are known for their strong axles and good limited slip differential (when so equipped).

From 1988 to 1994, Ford Australia rebadged the Y60 Patrol as the Ford Maverick. This was a result of the Button car plan devised by the government of Australia. The car was mechanically similar, although the Nissan version had rear disc brakes depending on vehicle grade, while the Ford mostly had drum brakes and featured different paint colours and trim levels.

All wagons had a 95-liter main fuel tank with the utility having a 90-liter tank and the option of a 95-liter second tank.

Engine specifications

Fifth generation (Y61; 1997) 

Y61 models first appeared in December 1997, available in 4.5- and 4.8-litre petrol, 2.8-, 3.0-, and 4.2-litre turbo-diesel and 4.2-litre turbo-diesel intercooler variants. The alternative model codes of GR and GU were applied to left- and right-hand drive models, respectively.

The drivetrain was changed in this model, including larger CVs and less synchros in the manual gearboxes. The differential housings were widened to fall inline with the new body shape, but centers remained the same (H233 and H260). Some petrol wagons received a coil version of the H260 differential.

Comfort levels were increased over GQ, especially in the seating and NVH areas.

GU IV onwards
For the 2005 model year a significant facelift model was released, with new headlights, box flares on each guard and larger tail lights. The troubles that plagued the ZD30 diesel around the variable turbo geometry were resolved by this refresh.

That same year, Nissan stopped selling the Safari in Japan due to poor sales. Nissan also made a two-door pickup version of the Y61 series available as cab chassis and with a style side tray in some markets. Although a new model was launched, this Y61 series still sells for offroad enthusiasts but with few options.

Its TB48DE engine is very popular among the tuning community in the middle east, especially in the UAE.

As of 2014, Nissan discontinued the fifth generation model worldwide, except for South Africa, the Middle East, Paraguay, Haiti, Philippines, Nepal, Bolivia, Sri Lanka, and some African and Eastern European countries where the 4x4 competed against the Toyota Land Cruiser (J70). In Australia, the Y61 was sold until 2016, alongside the Y62.

Several special edition trims have been also been released in respective regions where the Y61 was and are currently being sold, of which some of them are The Presidential edition and 4XPRO edition (Philippines), The Legend edition (Philippines, South Africa and Australia), The 'Special' Super Safari edition (Middle East), The Falcon edition (Middle East), Gazelle, Gazelle Storm and Gazelle X editions (Middle East).

The Y61 is also still being produced for and used by United Nations agencies across different countries as well as some military branches and government sectors. They are mainly being used as security escorts vehicles, chief personnel carriers and off pavement patrol units.

Sixth generation (Y62; 2010) 

The all-new, sixth generation, Y62 series Nissan Patrol was launched on 13 February 2010 in Abu Dhabi. A luxury version (Z62) was sold as the Infiniti QX56 from 2010 (the first time that a Patrol-based vehicle had been sold in North America since 1969), which was later renamed the Infiniti QX80 in 2013. The Y62 was introduced in North America under the Armada nameplate in 2016, for the 2017 model year. It was presented as a replacement for the Titan-based first generation Nissan Armada (WA60).

As of 2017, the Y62 is powered by either a  /  4.0-litre VQ40DE V6 engine for the entry level XE and SE trims or a more powerful  /  5.6-litre VK56VD V8 engine for the upper level trims. The NISMO edition uses a tuned version of the 5.6-litre V8 producing 28 additional horsepower. Prior to the introduction of the 4.0-litre V6, a lower output  /  5.6-litre VK56DE V8 was designated for the entry level trims.

As of 2017, all models come with a 7-speed automatic transmission although Nissan previously offered a 5-speed automatic and also a 6-speed manual for the entry level trim. A variable 4×4 mode package allows switching between four drive modes: sand, on-road, rock and snow. A Hydraulic Body Motion Control System is available. An electronic-locking rear differential, hill start and hill descent control, as well as lane-departure warning, computer assisted braking and stability control. The Infiniti version launched in the United States in 2010, the first Patrol sold there since the 60 series. The Nissan Patrol launched in Australia in early 2013.

The Nissan Patrol is offered in various different trim levels in the Middle East: XE, SE, SE-Platinum City, LE, LE-Titanium, LE-Platinum City and NISMO Edition. In Australia the Ti and Ti-L trim levels are offered.

Facelift 
In 2014, a significant facelift arrived, with revised tail lights with red elements present, globe housings and built-in LED headlights. A new tan interior was added and new sets of wheels.

Nissan introduced a limited-run Patrol Black Special Edition in 200 units. These cars offer several enhancements such as red seats, chrome detailing and a black matte exterior paint scheme.

Nissan gave a second facelift to the 2019 Patrol before it will have a new version by 2020. Changes include a new front bumper featuring a deeper apron and a traditional round housing. The vehicle will be equipped with Nissan's Intelligent Mobility driver-assistance features like lane keeping assist, forward collision warning, automatic emergency braking for front and rear, rear cross traffic alert, and blind spot monitoring.

Patrol Desert Edition 
The Desert Edition comes with the 400 hp 5.6-litre (5552cc) engine, manually-adjusted cloth seats, navigation and regular suspension instead of the hydraulic body-control system.

Patrol Nismo 
On launching the Nismo brand in the Middle East, the Nissan Patrol Nismo was introduced at the launch event in Dubai along with the GT-R Nismo and 370Z Nismo. Unlike the standard Patrol, the Nismo version comes with (5.6-litre) V8 with  engine tuned by Nissan's Takumi craftsmen. The suspensions is upgraded with Bilstein shocks and fitted with 22-inch forged-alloy wheels.

References

External links 
 
 Nissan Patrol  at Nissan's global website
 Nissanh Heritage Nissan Safari

Patrol
Cars introduced in 1951
Full-size sport utility vehicles
Off-road vehicles
All-wheel-drive vehicles
Rear-wheel-drive vehicles
Flagship vehicles